The following industrial designers and product designers are among those who are noted for their accomplishments in industrial or product design, and/or who have made extraordinary contributions to industrial-design or philosophy.

This list is categorized by the main design movements of the twentieth century.  Although many industrial designers of this list followed many such trends, they are listed under the movement they are most associated with.

Arts and Crafts movement (1850–1920) 

 Walter Crane (1845–1915)
 William R. Lethaby (1857–1931)
 Arthur Heygate Mackmurdo (1851–1942)
 William Morris (1834–1896)
 Charles Voysey (1857–1941)
 Philip Webb (1831–1915)

The aesthetic movement (1860–1890) 
 Charles Robert Ashbee (1863–1942)
 Archibald Knox (1864–1933)

Japonisme (1850–1920) 
Also see Anglo japanese style
 Christopher Dresser (1834–1904)
 Edward William Godwin (1833-1886) sideboard

Thonet Bentwood (1850–onwards) 
 Thonet Bentwood

Art Nouveau (1880–1910) 
Also known as Vienna Secessionist in Austria, Jugendstil in Germany, Glasgow school in U.K.
 Victor Horta (1861–1947)
 Antoni Gaudí (1852–1926)
 Emile Gallé (1846–1904)
 Louis Majorelle (1859–1926)
 Henry Van de Velde (1863–1957)

Glasgow School (1880–1929)
 Charles Rennie Mackintosh (1868–1929) 
 Margaret MacDonald (1864–1933) 
 Frances MacDonald (1873 –1921)
 Herbert MacNair (1868-1955)

The Vienna Secession (1895–1905)
Note - This category also includes designers of the Wiener Werkstätte (1905-1932)

 Wilhelm Bernatzik(1853 – 1906)
 Josef Hoffmann (1870–1956)
 Gustav Klimt (1862 – 1918)
 Max Kurzweil (1867 – 1916
 Koloman Moser (1868 – 1918)
 Joseph Maria Olbrich 1867 – 1908)
 Lilly Reich (1885 – 1947)
 Otto Wagner (1841 – 1918)

Jugendstil (1895–1905)
 Joseph Maria Olbrich 1867 – 1908)
 Henry van de Velde
 Peter Behrens (1868 – 1940)

Modernism (1910-1939) 
 Alvar Aalto (1898–1976)
 Le Corbusier (1887–1965) Villa Savoye (built 1928 and 1931)
 Eileen Gray (1878–1976) E-1027 (built 1926-29)
 Charlotte Perriand (1903–1999) 
 Lilly Reich (1885–1947)
 Eero Saarinen (1910–1961) TWA Flight Center (built 1962)
 Carlo Scarpa (1906–1978)
 Frank Lloyd Wright (1867–1959) Fallingwater (built 1935)

De Stijl (1917–1928) 
 Theo van Doesburg (1883–1931)
 Gerrit Rietveld (1888–1964)
 Sophie Taeuber-Arp (1889–1943)
 Mart Stam (1899–1986)

Bauhaus (1920–1930) 
 Walter Gropius (1883–1969) 
 Marianne Brandt (1893–1983)
 Peter Behrens (1868–1940)
 Marcel Breuer (1902–1981)
 Josef Hartwig (1880–1956)
 Johannes Itten (1888–1967)
 Ludwig Mies van der Rohe (1886–1969)
 László Moholy-Nagy (1895–1946)
 Wilhelm Wagenfeld (1900–1990)
 Christian Dell (1893 – 1974)

Mid century modern (1945–1959) 
 Davis Allen (1916-1999)
 Charles (1907–1978) and Ray Eames (1912–1988)	
 George Nakashima (1905–1990)
 George Nelson (1908–1986)
 Greta von Nessen (1898–1975)
 Gio Ponti (1891–1979)
 David Rowland (1924–2010)
 Gaby Schreiber (1916–1991)

Bauhaus Students
 Hans Bellmann (1911-1990)
 Max Bill (1908–1994)
 Herbert Hirche (1910–2002)
 Wilhelm Wagenfeld (1900–1990)

Scandinavian design (1950's) 
 Aino Aalto (1894–1949)
 Eero Aarnio (born 1932)
 Kaj Franck (1911–1989)
 Simo Heikkilä (born 1943)
 Poul Henningsen (1894–1967)
 Arne Jacobsen (1902–1971)
 Jacob Jensen (1926–2015)
 Henning Koppel (1918–1981)
 Bruno Mathsson (1907–1988)
 Verner Panton (1926–1998)
 Jens Quistgaard (1919–2008)
 Timo Sarpaneva (1926–2006)
 Oiva Toikka (1931–2019)
 Tapio Wirkkala (1915–1985)

Art Deco (1919–1940) 
 Émile-Jacques Ruhlmann (1879–1933)
 George Jensen (1966–1935)
 Alfonso Bialetti (1888–1970)
 George Carwardine (1887–1947) 
 Marcello Nizzoli (1887–1969)
 Donald Deskey (1894–1989)
 Buckminster Fuller (1895–1983)
 Belle Kogan (1902–2000)
 Alexis de Sakhnoffsky (1901–1964)
 Viktor Schreckengost (1906–2008)
 Walter Dorwin Teague (1883–1960)
 Russel Wright (1904–1976)
 Eva Zeisel (1906–2011)
 Maurice Ascalon (1913–2003)

Constructivist architecture and Constructivism (art) (1920s - early 1930s) 
Moisei Ginzburg, architect (1892–1946)
Alexander Rodchenko – (1891–1956)
Naum Gabo – (1890–1977)
László Moholy-Nagy – (1895–1946)
Antoine Pevsner – (1886–1962)
Lyubov Popova – (1889–1924)
Vladimir Tatlin (1885–1953)
Hermann Glöckner, painter and sculptor (1889–1987)

Streamline Moderne (1870–1939) 
 Henry Dreyfuss (1904–1972)
 Raymond Loewy (1893–1986)
 Norman Bel Geddes (1893–1958)

Cultural Revolution Radical period (design) (1960-1979) 
 Gaetano Pesce (born 1939)
 Archizoom (Florence)
 Superstudio (founded 1966) Florence, Italy
 Studio 65 (founded 1965)
 Piero Gilardi
 Piero Gatti, Cesare Paolini, Franco Teodoro (founded 1965), Turin, Italy

Pop design (1960's) 
 Harry Bertoia (1915–1978)
 Robin Day (1915–2010)
 Joe Cesare Colombo (1930–1971)
 Olivier Mourgue (born 1939)

Italian design (1960–1970's) 
 Mario Bellini (born 1935)
 Cini Boeri (1924–2020)
 Achille Castiglioni (1918–2002)
 Livio Castiglioni (1911–1979)
 Pier Giacomo Castiglioni (1913–1968)
 Vico Magistretti (1920–2006)
 Angelo Mangiarotti (1921–2012)
 Alberto Meda (born 1945)
 Alessandro Mendini (1931–2019)
 Bruno Munari (1907–1998)
 Roberto Pezzetta (born 1946)
 Gio Ponti (1891–1979) 
 Richard Sapper (1932–2015)
 Afra and Tobia Scarpa (born 1937 and 1935)
 Lella Vignelli (1934–2016)
 Massimo Vignelli (1931–2014)
 Marco Zanuso (1916–2001)

 Piero Gatti, Cesare Paolini, Franco Teodoro (active 1965–1983)

Postmodern architecture (1959) onwards 
 Robert Venturi (1925–2018)
 Michael Graves (1934–2015)
 Hans Hollein (1934–2014)
 Zaha Hadid (1950- 2016)
 Frank Gehry (born 1929)

Postmodernism: Style and Subversion 1970 - 1990 
 Ron Arad (born 1951)
 Luigi Colani (1928–2019)
 Ingo Maurer (1932-2019)
 Droog Design Founded 1993
 Philippe Starck (born 1949)

Studio Alchimia (1976-1980) 
 Michele De Lucchi (born 1951)
 Ettore Sottsass Jr. (1917 – 2007)
 Alessandro Mendini 
 Andrea Branzi (born 1938)
 Paola Navone (born 1950)
 Trix & Robert Haussmann

Memphis Group (1980-1987) 
 Marco Zanuso (1916 – 2001)
 Ettore Sottsass (1917 – 2007)
 Alessandro Mendini(1931 – 2019) 
 Michael Graves (1934 – 2015)
 Shiro Kuramata (1934–1991)
 Andrea Branzi (born 1938)
 George Sowden (born 1942)
 Peter Shire (born 1947) 
 Javier Mariscal (born 1950)
 Michele De Lucchi (1951)
 Matteo Thun (born 1952)
 Aldo Cibic (born 1955)
 Nathalie du Pasquier (born 1957)
 Massimo Iosa Ghini (born 1959)
 Marco Zanini (born 1971)

Japanese design and Architecture

 Isamu Noguchi (1904 – 1988)
 Isamu Kenmochi (1912-1971)
 Kenji Ekuan (1929 – 2015)
 Shiro Kuramata (1934–1991)
 Issey Miyake (born 1938)
 Tadao Ando (born 1942)
 Tokujin Yoshioka (1967)
 Naoto Fukasawa (born 1956)
 Kengo Kuma (born 1954)
 Tokujin Yoshioka (born 1967))

Contemporary Industrial Design

 Virgil Abloh (1980–2021)
 Ini Archibong (born 1983)
 Sebastian Bergne (born 1966)
 Edward Barber and Jay Osgerby (born 1969)
 Yves Béhar (born 1967)
 Ayse Birsel (born 1964)
 Ronan and Erwan Bouroullec (born 1971 and 1976)
 Don Chadwick (born 1936)
 Antonio Citterio (born 1955)
 Niels Diffrient (1928 – 2013)
 Tom Dixon (born 1959)
 James Dyson (born 1947)
 Hartmut Esslinger (1944)
 Norman Foster (born 1935)
 Naoto Fukasawa (born 1956)
 Giorgetto Giugiaro (born 1938)
 Kenneth Grange (born 1929)
 Konstantin Grcic (born 1965)
 Sam Hecht (born 1969)
 Richard Hutten (born 1967)
 James Irvine (1958–2013)
 Jonathan Ive (born 1967)
 Hella Jongerius (born 1963)
 Max Lamb (born 1980)
 Herbert Lindinger (born 1933)
 Ross Lovegrove (born 1958)
 Alberto Meda (born 1945)
 Jasper Morrison (born 1959)
 Marc Newson (born 1963)
 Jonathan Olivares (born 1981)
 Satyendra Pakhale (born 1967)
 Neil Poulton (born 1963)
 Dieter Rams (born 1932)
 Karim Rashid (born 1960)
 Samuel Ross (born 1991)
 David Rowland (1924–2010)
 Manuel Saez (born 1973)
 Oki Sato (born 1977)
 Inga Sempé (born 1968)
 Wieki Somers (born 1976)
 Christopher Stringer (born 1965)
 Matteo Thun (born 1952)
 Patricia Urquiola (born 1961)
 Marcel Wanders (born 1963)
 Michael Young (born 1966)

References

Sensory design

Lists of artists by medium
 
designers